DNPO may refer to:

 Bis(2,4-dinitrophenyl) oxalate, a chemical used in glowsticks
 Dinitrogen pentoxide, an inorganic chemical compound
 DNPO, the ICAO airport code for Port Harcourt International Airport
 "Do Not Power On", acronym used in Data Center administration to warn others not to power on server machines Server (Computing).  See Lockout-Tagout.